Anticosti Island is an island in the Minganie Regional County Municipality, in administrative region of Côte-Nord, the province of Quebec, Canada.

This island is located at the outlet of the St. Lawrence River into the Gulf of Saint Lawrence, between 49° and 50° N., and between 61° 40' and 64° 30' W. At  in size, it is the 90th largest island in the world and 20th largest island in Canada. Anticosti Island is separated on the north from the Côte-Nord region of Quebec (the Labrador Peninsula) by the Jacques Cartier Strait, and on the south from the Gaspé Peninsula by the Honguedo Strait.

Anticosti Island is larger than Prince Edward Island but sparsely populated (218 people in 2016), with most of the permanent population in the village of Port-Menier on the western tip of the island, consisting chiefly of the keepers of the lighthouses erected by the Canadian government. The entire island constitutes one municipality known as L'Île-d'Anticosti.

Due to more than 400 shipwrecks off its coasts, Anticosti Island is sometimes called the "Cemetery of the Gulf".

Geography

Anticosti Island is part of the eastern Saint Lawrence lowlands. There are large shoals to the south.

The largest lake on the island is Lake Wickenden, which feeds the Jupiter River. There are numerous rivers on Anticosti, many of which flow through deep gorges and canyons to the north and south shores.

This plateau is an unidirectional structure slightly tilted to the south, and is characterized by rolling cuestas. These are the most complete strata in eastern North America of the Ordovician and Silurian periods.

The main rivers are:

South shore of Anticosti Island (from west to east):

Plantain River
Gamache River (Anticosti Island)
Trois Milles River
Rivière aux Canards (Anticosti Island)
La Petite Rivière (Anticosti Island - Western part)
Rivière aux Graines (Anticosti Island)
Bec-Scie River
Sainte-Marie River (Anticosti Island)
Rivière aux Cailloux
Sainte Anne River (Anticosti Island)
Rivière à la Loutre (Anticosti Island)
Rivière au Fusil
Jupiter River
Rivière à la Chute (Anticosti Island)
Rivière du Brick
Galiote River
Rivière aux Rats (Anticosti Island)
Chicotte River
Rivière aux Plats
Pavillon River
Pavillon East River
Ferrée River (Anticosti Island)
Maccan River (Anticosti Island)
Bilodeau River
Little Chaloupe River
Chaloupe River (Anticosti Island)
Dauphiné River
Bell River (Anticosti Island)
Petite rivière de la Loutre
Loups Marins River (Anticosti Island)
Cormoran River
La Petite Rivière (Anticosti Island - Eastern part)

North shore of Anticosti Island (from west to east):

Huile River
Patate River
Observation River
Vauréal River
Des Petits Jardins River
Rivière de l'Ours
Natiscotec River
Métallique River
Rivière aux Saumons (Anticosti Island)
Schmitt River
Prinsta River
Renard River (Anticosti Island)

Climate 

Anticosti Island has a subarctic climate (Dfc), tempered by the maritime influence of the Gulf of St. Lawrence which reduces the temperature differences. Conversely, February is the coldest month, on average .

History

Indigenous history
For thousands of years, Anticosti Island was the territory of the indigenous peoples who lived on the mainland and used it as a hunting ground. The Innu called it Notiskuan, translated as "where bears are hunted" and the Mi'kmaq called it Natigôsteg, meaning "forward land".

Colonisation and settlement
The French explorer Jacques Cartier sailed along its shore in the summer of 1534. He provided its first written description and named it Isle de l'Assomption, because he reached it on the Day of the Assumption of Mary. This name had fallen into disuse by 1656. About 1586, the historian André Thevet wrote that "the savages named [it] Naticousti", while Samuel de Champlain spelled it Antiscoti (1612), Antiscoty (1613), Enticosty (1625) and Antycosty (1632). From that time on, France had officially incorporated the island into its colonial empire.

The island's first European settlers arrived in 1680 when Louis XIV gave Louis Jolliet the Seigneury of the Mingan Archipelago and Anticosti Island as compensation for reconnoitring the Mississippi and Hudson Bay.  Louis Jolliet erected a fort on Anticosti and in the spring of 1681 settled there with his wife, four children and six servants. His fort was captured and occupied during the winter of 1690 by some of the Massachusetts troops of William Phips during their retreat after an unsuccessful attempt to capture Quebec City. After Jolliet's death in 1700, the island was divided among his three sons and the Jolliet family retained ownership until 1763 when the island became part of British North America under the terms of the Treaty of Paris that ended the Seven Years' War. That same year, the island was annexed to Newfoundland until 1774 when it was returned to Lower Canada and annexed again to Newfoundland from 1809 to 1825. It became a part of Quebec (as Lower Canada came to be called) at the Canadian Confederation in 1867. During these years the island property changed hands several times, its owners generally using it for the harvesting of timber; otherwise no real development took place. For example, the French Canadian Gabriel-Elzéar Taschereau owned it among other seigneuries and made money from them.

In 1874, it was bought by the Anticosti Island Company and they founded the villages at English Bay and Fox Bay. Most of the inhabitants, however, continued to be the few keepers of the island's many lighthouses. Because of the number of shipwrecks around the island, stores of provisions were also maintained around the island for sailors who might be washed ashore. In 1882, the Parish of Notre-Dame-de-l'Assomption was founded, a term referring to Cartier's name for the island. In 1884, the island became property of the Stockwell brothers who formed a forestry company two years later. But they were unsuccessful and the company lasted only five years. By the 1890s, the fish and wildlife of the island had been almost eradicated through the new locals' indiscriminate slaughter.

In 1895, Anticosti was sold for $125,000 to French chocolate maker Henri Menier who also leased the shore fishing rights. He constructed the entire village of Port-Menier, built a cannery for packing fish and lobsters, and attempted to develop its resources of lumber, peat and minerals. Many of the original houses still stand today. Furthermore, he converted the island into a personal game preserve and introduced nonindigenous animals for this purpose, including a herd of 220 white-tailed deer. The deer thrived and today the population exceeds 160,000 while the island's moose population is about 1,000. It has been reported that black bears, which rely on berries to bulk on for the winter, had lived on the island until the introduction, but have disappeared perhaps because of the deer eating the berry bushes bare.

Henri Menier died in 1913 and his brother Gaston became the owner of Anticosti Island. He used and maintained it for a time but eventually decided it was not an economically viable operation and sold it to the Wayagamack Pulp and Paper Company in 1926 for $6,000,000. For the next five decades, the island was used almost exclusively by forestry companies which harvested timber and built some infrastructure, mainly roads, but abandoned the villages at English Bay and Fox Bay.

Wayagamack's timber production was successful until the Great Depression when the paper market collapsed. The island property was taken over by Consolidated Paper Corporation Limited in 1931, but they showed little interest in it and put it up for sale. Offers came from Canadian, American, British, French and Belgian parties. In July 1937, an offer was received from a consortium of Dutch and German capitalists who intended to build a sulphite mill and wanted a steady supply of pulpwood and access to Canadian capital. In the autumn of that year, a team of German surveyors travelled to the island to examine its timber and export potential. When this story broke in the Montreal Gazette of 2 December 1937, it caused an immediate controversy since the story claimed that the survey team was really made up of Adolf Hitler's agents and that most were naval, military and fortifications experts. Despite the substantial offer, the promise of thousands of new jobs, and the fact that there were no legal methods to block the sale, the suspicions remained. A committee was set up to investigate the affair but concluded that "there was no evidence to indicate that the project has other than a commercial purpose". However, when the deadline to purchase the island passed on 15 September 1938, the offer expired and controversy died out.

In 1974, the government of Quebec purchased the island from the forestry company Consolidated Bathurst Ltd. for $23,780,000. Anticosti was placed under management by the Ministry of Recreation, Hunting and Fishing (ministère du Loisir de la Chasse et de la Pêche) and in 1983 the process began to set up a working municipal structure. Today, about 60% is under management by Sépaq and since April 2001,  has been designated as a national conservation park. With its 24 rivers and streams bountiful with salmon and trout, the island is now a tourist destination for anglers and hunters, particularly from the United States and Canada, as well as for paleontologists, bird watchers and hikers.

Municipality of L'Île-d'Anticosti

Access and transportation
Access to the island is either by boat or plane. From April to mid-January, the commercial shipping company Relais Nordik services Port-Menier twice weekly with a passenger and cargo vessel.

The Port-Menier Airport is serviced by Air Liaison which provides regular scheduled flights to Sept-Îles and Havre-St-Pierre. There are two other aerodromes on the island, both towards the eastern end. Rivière-aux-Saumons (CTH7) is located on the northern side of the island and was paved in July 2010; Rivière Bell (CRB5) is gravel and is located on the southern side. These are used by outfitters and charter companies that provide private air services during the tourist season.

The Henri-Menier Road or Transanticostienne Road, the island's unpaved main road, stretches from Port-Menier to the eastern tip, with numerous forest roads branching off to provide access to various tourist locations and logging concessions. Car rental is available in Port-Menier.

Flora

The forests of Anticosti Island are typical boreal forest, with common species such as white spruce, balsam fir, and black spruce. It is distinguished by some minor stands of American white birch and trembling aspen. Balsam fir is slowly being replaced with white spruce because of intensive grazing done by deer and by periodic outbreaks of hemlock looper and spruce budworm. About a quarter of the island is covered by peat lands.

Anticosti Island is home to the rare lady's slipper orchid. While populations are declining elsewhere in eastern North America, the orchid flourishes here abundantly, making Anticosti a refuge for this plant.

Fauna
The wildlife is characteristic of an isolated marine environment. Of the 24 mammal species, 14 of these are marine mammals that include grey seals and harbour seals. Even large whales ply the nearby cold waters of the gulf.

Originally, there were probably only seven indigenous species of land mammals, namely the red fox, river otter, deer mouse, American marten, black bear and two bat species (the little brown and northern bat); the marten and bear have now been extirpated. Melanistic foxes have been seen on the island.

In order to make Anticosti Island a hunter's "paradise", several animal species have been introduced; starting in  1896, the island became an unprecedented biological experiment. In all, sixteen introduced species have been attempted, with six proving to be unsuccessful, namely bison, caribou, elk, mink and fisher. However, for ten species, it has been a beneficial introduction; six species of terrestrial mammals (white-tailed deer, moose, beaver, snowshoe hare and muskrat), two species of frogs, and two species of non-migratory birds (ruffed grouse and the spruce grouse). Of all these species introduced, the success of white-tailed deer is particularly noteworthy. From an initial group of about 200 (introduced in 1896 and 1897), the number of white-tailed deer has grown to an estimated 160,000 animals today, representing a density of 20 deer/km2. Without predators, this man-made deer population has had noticeable  impacts on the island ecosystem. Balsam fir trees covered about 40% of the island, prior to the introduction of the deer. The deer eat tender sprouts from the ground, and prevent fir regeneration; in turn, the firs are being replaced by white spruce.

The brook trout, Atlantic salmon and American eel visit the island's shores and swim up several rivers of the island.

Some 221 bird species, distributed among 21 avian families, have been observed on Anticosti Island. It is home to nearly 60% of the known breeding sites of the bald eagle in the province of Quebec.

Tourism

Because of its untamed wilderness and abundant wildlife, Anticosti Island is known for its hunting, fishing and outdoor opportunities and it attracts some 3,000 to 4,000 hunters per year.

Most of Anticosti Island is under management by Sépaq Anticosti, a division of the provincial parks and wildlife reserves agency Sépaq. It actively promotes tourism on the island, in particular hunting and fishing tours. Another  is protected in the Anticosti National Park (Parc national d'Anticosti). In addition to hunting and fishing, many other outdoor recreational activities are supported in this park, such as hiking, horseback riding, nature viewing and sea kayaking.

Utica Shale

The Utica Shale, a stratigraphical unit of Middle Ordovician age that is potentially rich in shale gas reserves, underlies the Anticosti Islands and extends to surrounding areas in Quebec, Ontario and much of northeastern United States. On February 8, 2011, the citizen group "Non au Pétrole et au Gaz au Québec" released one of the biggest petitions in Quebec history against fracking in the province of Quebec with 128,000 signatures thinking it would prevent the oil and gas exploration on Anticosti. In June 2011, the Quebec firm Pétrolia claimed to have discovered about 30 billion barrels of oil on the island of Anticosti, which is the first time that significant reserves have been found in the province.

In February 2014, Premier of Quebec Pauline Marois announced that the provincial government would help finance two exploratory shale gas operations as a prelude to hydraulic fracturing on the island, with the province pledging $115-million to finance drilling for two separate joint ventures in exchange for rights to 50% of the licences and 60% of any commercial profit.  It was the first oil and gas deal of any size for the province.  With the change in government that occurred in April 2014, the Liberals of Philippe Couillard could change that decision.  Petrolia Inc., Corridor Resources and Maurel & Prom formed one joint-venture, while Junex Inc. was still seeking a private partner.

On June 4, 2013, the citizen group "Non au Pétrole et au Gaz au Québec", realizing that fracking continued to be a viable method of oil extraction on Anticosti, released another petition that garnered 26,000 signatures against fracking, exploration and exploitation of oil and gas on Anticosti Island and asked for a moratorium and an environmental evaluation. Geological engineer Marc Durand gave a presentation at a conference explaining that a minimum of 12,000 wells would be necessary for this exploitation and would put Quebec in debt, considering the 12 million dollar cost of one of these wells. A year later, when Pauline Marois announced an investment of 115 million dollars for Petrolia to continue the exploration, the same petition increased up to 36,000 signatures. The government started a BAPE (environmental evaluation) specific for Anticosti and the report, published on October 3, is in favour of creating a protected area on the island.

See also
Henri de Miffonis
 List of islands of Quebec
 Maritime Quebec

Notes

References
 
 
 E. Billings, Geological Survey of Canada: Catalogue of the Silurian Fossils of Anticosti (Montreal, 1866)
 Logan, Geological Survey of Canada, Report of Progress from its Commencement to 1863 (Montreal, 1863–1865)
 Gretchen Eshbaugh Engel, Though Memory Plays Me False. A Story of Anticosti. The St. Lawrence River Isle of Enchantment, the life of William Hardy Eshbaugh and the role he played in its early development. (Southbury, CT, 1971)
 Charlie McCormick. Anticosti. (1996) Éditions JCL 
 Donald MacKay. Anticosti, The Untamed Island. (1979) McGraw-Hill Ryerson 
 Henri Menier.  Anticosti, 1905.  (Paris?  1905?).  30 original photographs by Henri Menier.  Autographed presentation copy to Lord Grey.  Collection of University of Saskatchewan Library, Saskatoon, Canada.
Alberta C. Pew, Joseph N. Pew, Jr., Margaret R. Leisenring, Edward B. Leisenring, Jay Cooke, A.E.F.: Anticosti Expeditionary Force (Philadelphia?: Privately Printed, 1935). Account of a private fishing expedition to the island.
 J. Schmitt, Anticosti (Paris, 1904).

External links

Sépaq Anticosti official website
Parc national d'Anticosti official website
 A virtual tour of Anticosti island

 Harry Forbes Diaries on Fishing Trips to Johann Beetz Bay, Quebec and the Anticosti Island at Dartmouth College Library

 
River islands of Quebec
Menier family
Islands of the Saint Lawrence River
Landforms of Côte-Nord
Geographic regions of Quebec